Urmatbek Amatov (born May 27, 1993) is a Kyrgyz Greco-Roman wrestler. He won silver medal at the 2018 Asian Wrestling Championships.

Major results

References

1993 births
Living people
Kyrgyzstani male sport wrestlers
Wrestlers at the 2010 Summer Youth Olympics
Youth Olympic gold medalists for Kyrgyzstan
Asian Wrestling Championships medalists
21st-century Kyrgyzstani people